Sajjad Haider Nadeem is a Pakistani politician who had been a member of the Provincial Assembly of the Punjab from August 2018 till January 2023.

Early life and education
He was born on 28 June 1957 in Sheikhupura, Pakistan.

He received a degree of Bachelor of Science (Hons) from the University of Agriculture Faisalabad in 1984.

Political career

He was elected to the Provincial Assembly of the Punjab as a candidate of Pakistan Muslim League (N) from Constituency PP-143 (Sheikhupura-IX) in 2018 Pakistani general election.

References

Living people
Pakistan Muslim League (N) MPAs (Punjab)
1957 births
University of Agriculture, Faisalabad alumni